Sebastian Chruściel (born 24 June 1997) is a professional footballer who plays as a defender for Super League 2 club Iraklis. Born in Greece, he has represented Poland at youth level.

Early life
Chruściel was born on 24 June 1997 in Cephalonia.

Career
In 2017, Chruściel signed for Polish second division side Olimpia Grudziądz after playing for the youth academy of Atromitos in the Greek top flight.

Before the second half of the 2017–18 season, he signed for Greek club Karaiskakis, where he made 19 league appearances and scored no goals.

In 2019, Chruściel signed for Panionios in the Greek top flight.

In 2020, he signed for Greek third division team Episkopi.

References

External links
 
 

Living people
1997 births
People from Cephalonia
Association football defenders
Polish footballers
Greek footballers
Polish expatriate footballers
Greek expatriate footballers
Poland youth international footballers
Greek people of Polish descent
Polish people of Greek descent
Citizens of Poland through descent
I liga players
Football League (Greece) players
Super League Greece 2 players
Olimpia Grudziądz players
Panionios F.C. players
A.E. Karaiskakis F.C. players
Episkopi F.C. players
Iraklis Thessaloniki F.C. players
Greek expatriate sportspeople in Poland
Expatriate footballers in Poland
Polish expatriate sportspeople in Greece
Expatriate footballers in Greece
Sportspeople from the Ionian Islands (region)